Free Will Baptists are a group of General Baptist denominations of Christianity that teach free grace, free salvation and free will. The movement can be traced back to the 1600s with the development of General Baptism in England. Its formal establishment is widely linked to the English theologian, Thomas Helwys who led the Baptist movement to believe in general atonement. He was an advocate of religious liberty at a time when to hold to such views could be dangerous and punishable by death. He died in prison as a consequence of the religious persecution of Protestant dissenters under King James I.

In 1702 Paul Palmer would go on to establish the movement in North Carolina and in 1727 formed the Free Will Baptist Church of Chowan. Many Calvinists became Free Will Baptists in the 19th century. With the establishment of Free Will Baptists in the South, Benjamin Randall developed the movement in the Northeastern United States, specifically Maine, Massachusetts, and New Hampshire.

From their beginning, Free Will Baptists, in common with many groups of English Dissenters and Separatists from the Church of England, followed Brownist notions of self-governance of local churches. The notion of free will was a systematic rejection of the Puritan movement, due to its overall religious beliefs and lack of social mobility.

History

Free Will Baptists can be traced to General Baptists from England who settled in the American colonies in the late 17th century. The first Baptists, who originated with the ministry of Thomas Helwys near London in 1611, were General Baptists. That is, they believed that the atonement of Jesus Christ was "general" (for all) rather than "particular" (only for the elect). It shares a common history, name, and an acceptance of the Arminian doctrine.

Benjamin Laker was an English Baptist who arrived in colonial Carolina as early as 1685. Laker had been associated with Thomas Grantham, a prominent General Baptist theologian and writer, and had signed the 1663 edition of the General Baptists' Standard Confession of Faith. The earliest Free Will Baptists in America developed from English General Baptists in Carolina, who were dubbed "Freewillers" by their enemies and later assumed the name.

Two distinct branches of Free Will Baptists developed in America. The first and earliest was the General Baptist movement described above, known as the Palmer movement in North Carolina, from which the majority of modern-day Free Will Baptists have their origin. The later movement was the Randall movement, which arose in the late 18th century in New Hampshire. These two groups developed independently of each other.

The Palmer line
In 1702, a disorganized group of General Baptists in Carolina wrote a request for help to the General Baptist Association in England. Though no help was forthcoming, Paul Palmer, whose wife Johanna was the stepdaughter of Benjamin Laker, would labor among these people 25 years later, founding the first "Free Will" Baptist church in Chowan, North Carolina in 1727. Palmer organized at least three churches in North Carolina. His labors, though important, were short. Leadership would descend to Joseph Parker, William Parker, Josiah Hart, William Sojourner and others. Joseph Parker was part of the organization of the Chowan church and ministered among the Carolina churches for over 60 years. From one church in 1727, they grew to over 20 churches by 1755. After 1755, missionary labors conducted by the Philadelphia Baptist Association converted most of these churches to the Particular Baptist positions of unconditional election and limited atonement. By 1770, only 4 churches and 4 ministers remained of the General Baptist persuasion. By the end of 18th century, these churches were commonly referred to as "Free Will Baptist", and this would later be referred to as the "Palmer line of Free Will Baptists". The churches in the Palmer line organized various associations and conferences, and finally organized a General Conference in 1921. Many Baptists from Calvinistic Baptist backgrounds, primarily Separate Baptists, became Free Will Baptists in the 19th century.

The Randall line
While the movement in the South was struggling, a new movement rose in the North through the work of Benjamin Randall (1749–1808). Randall initially united with the Particular Baptists in 1776, but broke with them in 1779 due to their strict views on predestination. In 1780, Randall formed a "Free" or "Freewill" (Randall would combine the words "free" and "will" into a single word) Baptist church in New Durham, New Hampshire. By 1782 twelve churches had been founded, and they organized a Quarterly Meeting. In 1792 a Yearly Meeting was organized.

The "Randall" line itself split into two groups in 1835:
 The "Bullockites", after founder Jeremiah Bullock (sometimes spelled "Bulloch" and "Bullochites"), which branched out to a small number of congregations in Maine and New Hampshire.
 The "Buzzelites", after founder John Buzzell.
The Bullockites, mostly under the name "Freewill Baptists", continued in Maine into the early 20th century, while the Buzzellites disappeared shortly after their founding.

The "Randall" line of Freewill Baptists grew quickly. However, in 1911, the majority of the Randall Line churches (and all the denominational property) merged with the Northern Baptist Convention. Those churches that did not merge and remained Freewill Baptist joined with other Free Will Baptists in the Southwest and Midwest to organize the Cooperative General Association of Free Will Baptists in 1916.

The union of the lines

Fraternal relations had existed between the Northern and Southern Free Will Baptists, but the question of slavery, and later the Civil War, prevented any formal union until the 20th century. On November 5, 1935, representatives of the General Conference (Palmer) and the Cooperative General Association (a mixture of Randall and Palmer elements west of the Mississippi) met in Nashville, Tennessee, to unite and organize the National Association of Free Will Baptists. The majority of Free Will Baptist churches organized under this umbrella, which remains the largest of the Free Will Baptist groups to this day.

Theology and practice
Free Will Baptist congregations believe the Bible is the very word of God and without error in all that it affirms. Free Will Baptist doctrine teaches that God desires salvation for all and sent Jesus to die for everyone. Still, Free Will Baptists believe God has given man the freedom of choice to accept or reject Christ’s sacrifice. Faith is the condition for salvation; hence, Free Will Baptists hold to conditional security. An individual is "saved by faith and kept by faith." In support of this concept, some Free Will Baptists refer to the Greek word translated "believeth" found in John 3:16 in the King James translation. This is a continuous action verb and can thus be read, "that whosoever believes and continues to believe shall not perish, but have everlasting life." The concept is not of someone sinning occasionally and thus accidentally ending up "not saved," but instead of someone "repudiating" his or her faith in Christ. Thus "once saved, always saved" is rejected by the denomination.

On Perseverance of the Saints from the official Treatise:
"There are strong grounds to hope that the truly regenerate will persevere unto the end, and be saved, through the power of divine grace which is pledged for their support; but their future obedience and final salvation are neither determined nor certain, since through infirmity and manifold temptations they are in danger of falling; and they ought, therefore, to watch and pray lest they make shipwreck of their faith and be lost."

Free Will Baptists observe at least three ordinances: baptism, the Lord's Supper, and the Washing of the Saints' Feet, a rite occurring among some other evangelical groups but not practiced by the majority of Baptist denominations.

Free Will Baptist congregations hold differing views on eschatology, with some holding premillennial and others amillennial views. Churches advocate (voluntary) tithing, totally abstaining from alcoholic beverages, and not working on Sunday, the Christian Sabbath.

Free Will Baptist bodies
The National Association of Free Will Baptists is the largest of the Free Will Baptist groups. Other major Free Will Baptist groups include:
 Original Free Will Baptist Convention – a North Carolina-based body of Free Will Baptists that was organized in 1913 and initially joined the National Association of Free Will Baptists, but split from the National Association in 1961 due to some inner differences. The Convention comprised the majority of North Carolina-based Free Will Baptist churches, though a minority would split from the North Carolina state convention and maintain affiliation with the National Association. The Convention also maintains mission activity in eight countries – Philippines, Mexico, Bulgaria, India, Nepal, Bangladesh, Liberia, and Guinea.
 United American Free Will Baptist Church – the largest body of African-American Free Will Baptist churches, organized in 1901 and headquartered in Kinston, North Carolina.
 United American Free Will Baptist Conference – a body of African-American Free Will Baptist churches that withdrew from the United American Free Will Baptist Church in 1968; headquartered in Lakeland, Florida.
 Old Original Free Will Baptist Conference, an episcopal African-American association with six churches, centered in North Carolina.
 Evangelical Free Baptist Church – based in Illinois. In 1987 it had 22 churches and 2,500 members.
 Unaffiliated Free Will Baptist local associations – a number of local Free Will Baptist associations remain independent of the National Association, Original FWB Convention, and the two United American bodies. Researchers have identified 10 such associations, though there may be more. The unaffiliated associations of Free Will Baptists include over 300 churches with an estimated 22,000 members. They have no organization beyond the "local" level.

See also
 Storer College
 Welch College

References

Further reading
 Bryant, Scott. The Awakening of the Freewill Baptists: Benjamin Randall and the Founding of an American Religious Tradition (Mercer University Press, 2011) 228 pp.
 
 Davidson, William F. The Free Will Baptists in History
 Hill, Samuel S., ed. Encyclopedia of Religion in the South
 Leonard, Bill, ed. Dictionary of Baptists in America
 Pelt, Michael. A History of Original Free Will Baptists
 Pinson, J. Matthew. A Free Will Baptist Handbook: Heritage, Beliefs, and Ministries

External links

 Benjamin Randall – Christian History Institute's Biographical Sketch
 Arkansas State Association of Free Will Baptists
 California State Association of Free Will Baptists
 International Fellowship of Free Will Baptist Churches
 National Association of Free Will Baptists (US)
 United American Free Will Baptist Conference, Inc.
 The Convention of Original Free Will Baptist Churches
 The Original Free Will Baptist International
 The Original Free Will Baptist Mission Church of Liberia
 Missouri State Association of Free Will Baptists
 Tennessee State Association of Free Will Baptists
 West Virginia State Association of Free Will Baptists

 
Arminian denominations
Evangelical denominations in North America
1727 establishments in the Thirteen Colonies
Baptist movements